Thomas or Tom Hedley may refer to:

 Thomas Hedley  (born 1942/43), British magazine editor and screenwriter
 Tom Hedley (footballer) (1882–1960), Australian rules footballer for Essendon

See Also 
 Thomas Hedley Reynolds (1920–2009), American historian
Thomas Hedley Co., former British soap and candles company